To Kill a Child (Swedish: Att döda ett barn) is a short story by Stig Dagerman. It was published in 1948 and was likely the most famous of Stig Dagerman's texts. The short story can be found in the Swedish posthumous collections Vårt behov av tröst (1955) and Dikter, noveller, prosafragment (1981).

Background 
The short story was written in 1948 for the National Society for Road Safety in an attempt to slow down the traffic and decrease the number of traffic accidents.

Plot 
In a scaled and clear prose, but with a fateful feel, the everyday life of the involved characters is depicted before one of them unintentionally hits a small child with a car. The readers know what will happen from the very start and the author works with a narration technique called planting. In the short story there exists very few details of the people involved which means that anyone can imagine themselves as the characters and relate to them. In the short story there are multiple plot lines since two courses of events happen simultaneously.

Adaptations 
Two films have been made based on the short story, To Kill a Child (1953) and To Kill a Child (2003). The latter was directed by Alexander Skarsgård.

References

External links 
 "Att döda ett barn". Student WWW server at CSC, KTH (full original text in Swedish).
 "To Kill a Child". The New York Review of Books (full translated text of the original).

Swedish fiction
1948 short stories
Swedish short stories
Swedish novellas
1948 Swedish novels